David Renwick Thompson (December 26, 1930 – February 19, 2011) was a United States circuit judge of the United States Court of Appeals for the Ninth Circuit.

Education and career
Thompson was born in San Diego, California and graduated from Point Loma High School. He received a Bachelor of Science degree in business from University of Southern California in 1952 and a Bachelor of Laws from University of Southern California Gould School of Law in 1955. He passed the State Bar of California in 1955. He was in the United States Navy from 1955 to 1957. He was in private practice of law in San Diego from 1957 to 1985.

Federal judicial service
On October 7, 1985, Thompson was nominated by President Ronald Reagan to a new seat on the United States Court of Appeals for the Ninth Circuit created by 98 Stat. 333. He was confirmed by the United States Senate on December 16, 1985, and received commission on December 17, 1985. He assumed senior status on December 31, 1998, serving in that status until his death.

Death
Thompson died on February 19, 2011, after a sudden illness. Thompson had traveled to San Francisco to hear oral arguments in several cases. He died at the city's St. Mary's Medical Center.

References

Sources

1930 births
2011 deaths
20th-century American judges
Judges of the United States Court of Appeals for the Ninth Circuit
United States court of appeals judges appointed by Ronald Reagan
Point Loma High School alumni
USC Gould School of Law alumni
United States Navy sailors